Edward Synan (1820 – 8 September 1887) was an Irish Home Rule League politician who served as a Member of Parliament (MP) for County Limerick from 1865 to 1885. He donated £6 to St Mary's Catholic Church, Pallaskenry.

References

External links 
 

1820 births
1887 deaths
Members of the Parliament of the United Kingdom for County Limerick constituencies (1801–1922)
UK MPs 1865–1868
UK MPs 1868–1874
UK MPs 1874–1880
UK MPs 1880–1885
Home Rule League MPs
Irish Parliamentary Party MPs